The discography of American singer-songwriter Angel Olsen consists of six studio albums, one collaborative album, two compilation albums, four extended plays, and eight singles.

Albums

Studio albums

Collaborative albums

Compilation albums

Extended plays

Singles

As lead artist

As featured artist

Guest appearances

With Bonnie "Prince" Billy
 Island Brothers (Vinyl 10"), February 2011, Drag City Records
 Wolfroy Goes to Town (CD/LP), October 2011, Drag City Records
 Now Here's My Plan (CD/LP), July 2012, Drag City Records

Videography

Notes

References

Folk music discographies
Rock music discographies
Pop music discographies